Friday Harbor Seaplane Base  is a public use seaplane base located adjacent to Friday Harbor, on San Juan Island in San Juan County, Washington, United States. It is owned by the Port of Friday Harbor.

Facilities and aircraft 

Friday Harbor Seaplane Base has two seaplane landing areas: 3/21 is 10,000 by 2,000 feet (3,048 x 610 m) and 12/30 is 6,000 by 1,000 feet (1,829 x 305 m).

For the 12-month period ending May 31, 2009, the airport had 8,600 aircraft operations, an average of 23 per day: 53.5% were air taxi flights and 46.5% general aviation.

Airlines and destinations

References

External links 
 Aerial image as of 10 July 1990 from USGS The National Map

Airports in Washington (state)
Airports in San Juan County, Washington
Seaplane bases in the United States